Aksuat is a brackish lake in the Kostanay Region, Kazakhstan.

Aksuat is a steppe lake of the central sector of the Turgay Basin in Nauyrzym District, Kostanay Region. Now uninhabited Naurzum village is located near the lake and the Naurzum Nature Reserve protected area is named after it.

Geography
Aksuat is an endorheic lake lying in the Ishim river valley, between Zharman lake to the north and Sarykopa farther to the south. The Karasu river flows into the lake from the southwest. In years of drought Aksuat may dry completely up. 

The lake freezes in November and its ice begins to melt in April. The banks are indented and the bottom of the lake is muddy. The water has a high concentration of minerals.

Fauna
Aksuat is part of the Naurzum Nature Reserve. It can support large concentrations of waterbirds such as the white-tailed lapwing, common goldeneye and squacco heron. There have been sightings of the critically endangered siberian crane, but few. 
Among the fish species found in the lake, perch, common roach and carp deserve mention.

See also
List of lakes of Kazakhstan

References

External links
Saryarka – Steppe Lakes of Northern Kazakhstan
Birds of Kazakhstan: new and interesting data, part 2

Lakes of Kazakhstan
Kostanay Region
Endorheic lakes of Asia